Sebastian Druszkiewicz (born 14 June 1986) is a Polish speed skater representing The Czech Republic. He was born in Zakopane. He competed at the 2010 Winter Olympics in Vancouver, where he placed 14th in men's 10,000 metres. He competed at the 2014 Winter Olympics in Sochi, in 5,000 metres and 10,000 metres.

References

External links 
 

1986 births
Living people
Czech male speed skaters
Polish male speed skaters
Sportspeople from Zakopane
Speed skaters at the 2010 Winter Olympics
Speed skaters at the 2014 Winter Olympics
Olympic speed skaters of Poland
Speed skaters at the 2007 Winter Universiade
Universiade medalists in speed skating
Universiade bronze medalists for Poland
Medalists at the 2007 Winter Universiade